is the fourth studio album by Håkan Hellström, released on 28 December 2005. In English the title corresponds to "Something old, something new, something borrowed, something blue." The title describes the nature of the album—some songs are leftovers from earlier recordings, some are newly written ones and a few others are covers. For example, "Jag vill ha allting" is a cover of Luna's "I Want Everything", while "13" is a version of the Big Star song "Thirteen".

Track listing 
""
"" Clubland
"" As Long As You Are with Me)
"" I Want It All
"" Just Like Romeo
"" August in Hell
"" I Hate That I Love You and I Love You So Much That I Hate Myself
""
""
"" Moving On
"" The Street Forward
""

Charts

Weekly charts

Year-end charts

References

2006 albums
Håkan Hellström albums
Swedish-language albums